2929 Entertainment, LLC. is an American integrated media and entertainment company co-founded by billionaire entrepreneurs Todd Wagner and Mark Cuban. 2929 maintains companies and interests across several industries including entertainment development and packaging, film and television production and distribution, digital and broadcast syndication, theatrical exhibition, and home entertainment.

2929 Entertainment has offices in Los Angeles, New York, and Dallas. Wagner and Cuban co-own 2929 with Sky Hansen serving as Managing Director.

History
2929 Entertainment made several strategic acquisitions to assure that releases could be made available to any audience across a variety of platforms simultaneously. Wagner says that "ready availability of such infrastructure would be an operating advantage to both the circuit and the production company." Some titles would even see DVD releases alongside theatrical openings as early as 2007, through an early partnership with Netflix.

An extensive catalogue of television and film rights were acquired with Rysher Entertainment in 2001, and 2929 would co-produce a newer version of Star Search which premiered in January 2003 on CBS (the original Star Search aired from 1983 to 1995).

Variety praised 2929 as a "pioneer" for its simultaneous theatrical and cable television release of Steven Soderbergh's Bubble in 2006. Bubble was the first of several films with concurrent releases in theaters and through 2929's cable channel HDNet. At the time, this move was controversial as most films are released in different formats on a staggered schedule, giving each channel an exclusive window. Exhibitors were especially timorous, as many feared that they would eventually lose their exclusive release windows for more mainstream films.

Operations

Production companies
2929 Entertainment develops original feature and series through its production company 2929 Productions, and formerly through HDNet Films.

2929 Productions, LLC

2929 Productions, LLC. was co-founded by Wagner and Cuban in 2002. The film and television studio selectively finances and develops feature films and series, often through partnerships with industry creators or entertainment companies.

2929 Productions is headed by Haley Jones. Previous studio leadership has included Ben Cosgrove (formerly of Paramount and Section Eight) and Marc Butan (MadRiver Pictures and formerly Lionsgate).

Godsend, Criminal and The Jacket were among of the studio's first projects, with the latter two being co-produced and co-financed with Steven Soderbergh and George Clooney's Section Eight Productions. After his work on Godsend, Marc Butan was offered studio head at 2929 leading him to exit an EVP role at Lionsgate.

In 2005, 2929 Productions released Good Night, And Good Luck. with Warner Independent. The film uses a mix of archival footage and contemporary production to tell the story of the famed wartime reporter Edward Murrow (David Strathairn) and his historic "See it Now" broadcast criticizing Senator Joseph McCarthy and the Red Scare. To mitigate risks that could arise with a black-and-white feature film, Wagner engaged Jeff Skoll and his company Participant Media to produce Good Night, And Good Luck, which grossed over $30 million (USA) and was nominated for six Academy Awards, including Best Picture.

HDNet Films
HDNet Films produced lower budget movies in high definition.

Distribution
Originally formed in 2001 by Bill Banowsky and Eamonn Bowles, Magnolia Pictures is the home entertainment and theatrical distribution subsidiary of 2929. In November 2005 the company created Magnolia Home Entertainment to release its films over home video, with its first release being Alex Gibney's acclaimed doc, Enron: The Smartest Guys in the Room. It is headed by entertainment industry vet and former head of home entertainment for Miramax, Randy Wells. Magnolia Pictures also provides its content through a curated streaming service, Magnolia Selects.

2929 also launched Truly Indie, an "innovative distribution program" for independent filmmakers.

Television
2929 holds a significant interest in AXS TV, which Cuban originally co-founded in 2001 as the all-high definition cable channel HDNet (through AXS TV LLC, formerly HDNet, LLC). HDNet Movies, a companion channel, shows movies in high definition. 2929 also owned Rysher Entertainment, a television syndication distributor with an extensive library of titles and syndication rights to TV shows like Hogan's Heroes, Sex and the City and Star Search. Rysher was later acquired by an investment company through Lakeshore Entertainment.

Former operations

Theatrical exhibition
2929 acquired Landmark Theatres September 24, 2003. The chain was originally founded by Kim Jorgensen in 1974 and specialized in independent and foreign films.
On December 4, 2018 the announcement was made that Landmark Theatres was sold to the Cohen Media Group, "a buyer who is passionate about independent cinema and who truly understands this market."

2929 maintains an interest in Spotlight Cinema Networks, a cinema advertising company.

References

External links

2929 Productions

2929 Entertainment holdings
Mass media companies established in 2003
Companies based in Dallas
Film production companies of the United States